States of Jersey Customs and Immigration Service, formed from the amalgamation of the Customs & Excise Department (formerly known as the Bureau des Impôts) and the Immigration and Nationality Department holds one of the oldest government posts in Jersey. The post of Agent of the Impôts, now Head of Service, dates back to 1602.

References

External links 

 

Customs
Customs services